Craig Luebben (20 May 1960 – 9 August 2009) was an American rock climber and author. A climber since the early 1980s, Luebben wrote a number of climbing-oriented books, designed the "Big Bro" wide-crack climbing protection device, and was a senior contributing editor for Climbing Magazine.

Craig was a 5.12 climber in that he could likely onsight any 5.12 on the planet."

Biography 
Craig Luebben was killed on August 9, 2009 in an accident while climbing on Mount Torment in the Cascade Range of Washington. A car-size block of ice calved off, taking Craig with it and resulting in a 30-foot fall. While not struck by the initial block, Craig was pelted by debris as he hung from his rope.

Luebben's 2004 book, Rock Climbing: Mastering Basic Skills, won that year's National Outdoor Book Award (Instructional).

The books 
 A Rock Climbers Guide to Greyrock, Horsetooth Press, 1991, ASIN B000RJ3RFY
 Knots for Climbers (1st & 2nd editions), The Globe Pequot Press, 1995 and 2001, 
 Advanced Rock Climbing, co-authored with John Long, The Globe Pequot Press, 1997, 
 How to Climb: How to Ice Climb!, The Globe Pequot Press, 1999, 
 How to Rappel!, The Globe Pequot Press, 2000, 
 Go Climb!, North South Publications, 2001, 
 Betty And The Silver Spider: Welcome To Gym Climbing, Sharp End Publishing, 2002, 
 Rock Climbing: Mastering Basic Skills, The Mountaineers Books 2004, 
 Rock Climbing Anchors: A Comprehensive Guide, The Mountaineers Books, 2006,

References

External links
 Craig Luebben's Official Web Site

1960 births
2009 deaths
American rock climbers
Accidental deaths from falls